Emrich Nicholson (1913–2001) was an American art director.

Selected filmography
 The Countess of Monte Cristo (1948)
 Kansas Raiders (1950)
 Son of Ali Baba (1952)
 Just Across the Street (1952)
 Taza, Son of Cochise (1954)
 Magnificent Obsession (1954)

References

Bibliography
Demetrius John Kitses. Horizons West; Anthony Mann, Budd Boetticher, Sam Peckinpah: studies of authorship within the western. Indiana University Press, 1970.

External links

1913 births
2001 deaths
American art directors